Phil "Satyros" Brucato is an American writer, journalist, editor, and game designer based in Seattle, Washington. He is best known for his work on the TV series Strowlers and with White Wolf, Inc., including the role-playing games Mage: The Ascension, Werewolf: The Apocalypse, and Mage: The Sorcerer's Crusade. He has also written articles for BBI Media's newWitch and Witches & Pagans magazines, as well as other media such as Deliria: Faerie Tales for a New Millennium, the urban fantasy webcomic Arpeggio, and various short stories. Additionally, he has founded Quiet Thunder Productions and is a member of the Wily Writers group.

Arpeggio Webcomic
Phil Brucato, Bryan Syme, and Sandra Buskirk began publishing Arpeggio in 2010. The story follows Meghan Susan Green, a young teenager, as she explores her magical musical talents. Although the comic was only produced between 2008 and 2012, Patreon users were able to access the final, previously unpublished "episodes" in 2015 and 2016.

Ravens in the Library
Ravens in the Library is a limited-edition fantasy anthology published in 2009 as part of a fundraiser for singer/songwriter S.J. Tucker, who had been hospitalized due to serious medical issues. Brucato co-edited this anthology with Sandra Buskirk, and it became their first publication through Quiet Thunder Productions. Contributing authors and illustrators include Laurell K. Hamilton, Terri Windling, Charles de Lint, Neil Gaiman, Francesca Lia Block, Holly Black, Stephanie Pui-Mun Law, James A. Owen, and Amy Brown.

Television

Strowlers 

 Pilot

Books

Deliria: Faerie Tales for a New Millennium

Goblin Markets: The Glitter Trade
Everyday Heroes: Adventures for the Rest of Us
Deliria: Faerie Tales for a New Millennium

White Wolf, Inc.

World of Darkness: Changing Breeds
The Swashbuckler's Handbook
Infernalism: The Path of Screams
Revelations of the Dark Mother
Destiny's Price
Vampire: The Masquerade, Revised Edition
Kindred of the East
Guide to the Technocracy
Mage: The Sorcerers Crusade
Bastet: Nine Tribes of Twilight
Cult of Ecstasy: Tradition Book
Vampire: The Dark Ages
Mage: The Ascension, 2nd Edition
The Fragile Path: Testaments of the First Cabal
Changeling: The Dreaming
Black Furies

Onyx Path Publishing

Mage 20th Anniversary Edition
Mage 20th Anniversary Edition: Quickstart
Mage 20th Anniversary Edition: How Do You DO That?
Mage 20th Anniversary Edition: Book of Secrets
The Art of Mage: 20 Years and More
Truth Beyond Paradox

Other role-playing works

The Best Little Hellhouse in Texas
Star Wars: Creatures of the Galaxy

Other Notable Works

Open Your Heart to the Magic of Love (editor)
Ravens in the Library
Love Wisdom: A Soul's Journey to Wellness (editor)
Rites of Pleasure: Sexuality in Wicca and Neo-Paganism
Tritone: Tales of Musical Weirdness

Short fiction

Wyldsight: Tales of Primal Fantasy 

Waves
Gramma Wolf's Garden
Elynne Dragonchild
Drinking the Moon
Chaser

Where Thy Dark Eye Glances: Queering Edgar Allan Poe 

The Lord's Greatest Jest

Deep Cuts: 19 Tales of Mayhem, Menace & Misery 

Clown Balloons

Urban Green Man 

Johnny Serious

Night-Mantled 

 I Feel Lucky

Maelstrom: Tales of Madness and Horror 

The Green Tunnel

Cabinet des Fées 

Drinking the Moon

Steampunk Tales 

Stormada

newWitch Magazine 

Vahlhalla with a Twist of Lethe

Bad-Ass Faeries 

Loopholes

Weird Tales Magazine 

Ravenous

Backstage Passes 

Special Guest

When Will You Rage? 

Shards

Drums Around the Fire 

Patchbelly and the Plague Wolf

Audio fiction

Wiley Writers Podcast 

 Chaser

Essays, interviews, and columns

Tinker Tailor Soldier Sponge 

 Don't be a Dick (with Satyros Brucato)

The Ancient Wisdom Salvage Yard Podcast 

 Episode 24: Wherein We Discover the Magick of Games

Ultraculture 

 Mage: The Ascension's Phil Brucato on Life as Magick

Books of M 

 Green Room Writing

Tarot Visions 

 Interview with Satyros Phil Brucato

Voice of Stone 

 Talking with Satyros Phil Brucato

Onyx Pathcast 

 Magic with a K

The Bears Grove (episodes 40-43) 

 Phil Brucato Interview

Witches & Pagans and newWitch Magazine 

Spell It Out
Chalice & Keyboard

Realms of Fantasy 

Folkroots

Creative Loafing Magazine 

 Footlights

Agenda Magazine 

 Sand, Not Oil

Night Moves Magazine 

On Screen

Music
In 1989, Phil Brucato became a founding member of Lonesome Crow, a heavy metal band from Richmond, Virginia. Throughout the 90s, he played bass for Dark Cross, Aqua Blue, Widdershins, and Path of Trees. He has also dabbled in dance, especially contact improvisation, and is part of several 5Rhythms groups around San Francisco, Asheville, and Seattle.

Awards
 ENnie Award for Everyday Heroes: Adventures for the Rest of Us – Best Written, 2005
 Wizard Magazine Editor's Choice Award for Mage: The Sorcerers Crusade – Best RPG Supplement, 1998
 Out of the Box Award for Mage: The Sorcerers Crusade – Readers’ Favorite, 1998
 GAMA award for Mage: The Ascension, 2nd Edition – Best Roleplaying Game, 1996
 RPGA award for Mage: The Ascension, 2nd Edition — Reader's Choice, 1996

References

External links
 Phil's Brucato's blog
 Phil Brucato's Amazon author page
 Where to Find Phil Brucato's fiction

Living people
Role-playing game designers
White Wolf game designers
American modern pagans
Modern pagan writers
Year of birth missing (living people)